The 1944 Soviet Chess Championship was the 13th edition of USSR Chess Championship. The tournament was won by Mikhail Botvinnik.

Tables and results

References 

USSR Chess Championships
Championship
Chess
1944 in chess
Chess